The 2006–07 United Counties League season was the 100th in the history of the United Counties League, a football competition in England.

Premier Division

The Premier Division featured 20 clubs which competed in the division last season, along with one new club:
Wellingborough Town, promoted from Division One

League table

Division One

Division One featured 16 clubs which competed in the division last season, no new clubs joined the division this season.

League table

References

External links
 United Counties League

9
United Counties League seasons